Freemasonry in the United States is the history of Freemasonry as it was introduced from Britain and continues as a major secret society to the present day. It is a fraternal order that brings men together (and women's auxiliaries) to gain friendship and opportunity for advancement and community progress. It has been nonpolitical except for a period around 1820 when it came under heavy attack in the Northeast. That attack reduced membership, but it recovered and grew after 1850. Growth ended in the late 20th century and membership has declined.

Colonial Era

Grand Lodges founded during the Colonial Era

Freemasonry spread from the British Isles during the Colonial Era.  All of the "original" Grand Lodges began to issue charters to individual lodges in North America, but the two English Grand Lodges (the "Ancients" and the "Moderns") were the most prolific. Starting in 1730 The Grand Lodge of England (Moderns) began to issue Warrants for Provincial Grand Lodges in the colonies.  Initially, these Warrants were issued to individuals, to act as deputies for the Grand Master in a given area for fixed periods of time, and some confusion resulted due to overlapping jurisdictions. To confuse matters further, with the formation of the Antient Grand Lodge, rival Provincial Grand Lodges were chartered under their jurisdiction.

  "Coxe" Provincial Grand Lodge of Pennsylvania, New Jersey, & New York (Moderns) - Est. 1730 - by warrant issued to Daniel Coxe by GLE for two years, allowing for a successor to be elected.  Granted jurisdiction over Pennsylvania, New Jersey, and New York.  Successors claimed jurisdiction only over Pennsylvania.  The Grand Lodge of Pennsylvania dates itself from the formation of this Provincial Grand Lodge. 
  Provincial Grand Lodge of New England (Moderns) - Est. 1733 by warrant given to Henry Price.  The Grand Lodge of Massachusetts dates itself from the formation of this Provincial Grand Lodge.
  Provincial Grand Lodge of South Carolina - Est. 1736
  Provincial Grand Lodge of North Carolina - Est. 1771
  Provincial Grand Lodge of New York (Moderns) - 1738-1780s - Warrants issued by GLE (Moderns) to Francis Goelet (1738–1753), to George Harrison (1753–1771), to Sir John Johnson (from 1771). As Johnson was a Loyalist during the American Revolution, he is believed to have taken his warrant with him when he fled to Canada, thus leaving the Moderns Lodges without a Provincial Grand Master.
  Provincial Grand Lodge for North America (Scotland) - Est. 1757 - By warrant issued to Colonel John Young.

  Provincial Grand Lodge for Pennsylvania (Ancients) - Est. 1761 - By Warrant issued to William Ball.
  Provincial Grand Lodge of New York ("Athol Charter" - Ancients) - 1781-1784 - Although this PGL was Warranted by the "Ancients", the final Provincial Grand Master, Chancellor Robert R. Livingston (PGM: 1784-87), was actually the Master of a Lodge under the Jurisdiction of the Moderns, thus uniting the two branches of English Freemasonry in New York State.  Livingston continued in office as the first Grand Master of the independent GL of NY.

Later Grand Lodges
See History of Masonic Grand Lodges in North America#Independent Grand Lodges

After the American Revolution, the various Provincial Grand Lodges were closed, and the Lodges in each state formed independent Grand Lodges. These in turn, chartered lodges in the new territories and states. As each new state came into being, the lodges that had been chartered within its borders gathered together and formed new Grand Lodges.

African American lodges

Prince Hall Freemasonry is a branch of North American Freemasonry for African Americans, founded by black activist Prince Hall in 1784. There are two main branches: the independent State Prince Hall Grand Lodges, most of which are recognized by White Masonic jurisdictions, and those under the jurisdiction of the National Grand Lodge. Prince Hall Freemasonry is the oldest and largest (300,000+ initiated members) predominantly African-American fraternity in the nation.

Rapid Growth 1800-1830
Masonic membership rolls grew rapidly in the fiorsat quarter of the 19th century, especially in the Northeast. Nationwide in 1800 there were 11 Grand lodges, 347 subordinate lodges, and about 16,000 members. By 1820 New York state alone had 300 lodges with 15,000 members, and by 1825 that state added another 150 lodges and 5,000 members.

In Latin America and continental Europe, where the French lodges predominated, Freemasony was deep into politics and opposition to the Catholic Church. Freemasonry in the U.S. with its British origins, studiously avoided any discussion of politics or support for political action.

Social and cultural roles

Historian Mark Carnes argues that the Freemasons as well as other fraternal societies especially the Odd Fellows. the Improved Order of Red Men, and the Knights of Pythias, helped redefine traditional masculinity through new secret rituals.  Soon lodges designed initiation ceremonies featuring chains, skeletons, robes, masks, blindfolds, and torch lights. This came in response to mainstream Protestant denominations which were innovating with liberal and feminized themes that devalued traditional masculinity. The result was a private set of attitudes and secret rituals that comprised an alternative counterculture. A leading California Mason had a vision of Freemasonry that rejected "Dreaminess and Nambi-Pambyism," as well as "sloppy sentimentalism" or "a lady's sewing circle" or a "church pink tea." But rather a sought, "A Real Man's Organization." 

Although women were not members, they were wives, and their support was helpful to the rapid recovery after the 1830s. Sarah Josepha Hale in 1823, with the financial support of her late husband's lodge, published a collection of her poems titled The Genius of Oblivion.  The Masonic movement continued their support for Hale's promotion of traditional ladylike roles throughout her career, especially when she served as editor for forty years of the nation's most influential women's magazine, Godey's Lady's Book," .

Anti-Masonic Party

The Anti-Masonic Party was a single-issue party in the late 1820s that strongly opposed Freemasonry, but later aspired to become a major party by expanding its platform to take positions on other issues. The party was founded following the disappearance of William Morgan, a former Mason who had become a prominent critic of the Masonic organization. Many believed that Masons had murdered Morgan for speaking out against Masonry and subsequently many evangelical churches condemned Masonry. As many Masons were prominent businessmen and politicians, and often were Episcopalians with no taste for revivalism, the backlash against the Masons was also a form of anti-elitism. The Anti-Masons saw conspiracy and argued that secretive, powerful Masons posed a threat to American republicanism by plotting to control the government. Furthermore, they warned that Masonry was hostile to evangelical Christianity. Fear of politicized Masonry soon coalesced into the Anti-Masonis Party. In New York, the Anti-Masons supplanted the National Republicans as the primary opposition to the Democrats.  Historians identify a hysteria that was rarely linked to facts.  The Masons were bitterly opposed to Morgan but they avoided state and national politics. They saw their role as facilitating the cooperation of political leaders of differing views and parties, so it would be fatal to endorse one party.  Bullock argues that Masons facilitated political cooperation by, "creating channels of communication and cooperation that eased the difficulties of organizing politics on a new scale in a political culture where challenges to elites provided a central theme."  Historians agree that often Masons were locally prominent, and perhaps did attempt a local cover-up of the Morgan case. But they find the main conspiracy argument exaggerated and bordering on paranoia, Membership had been growing rapidly; now it plunged even faster. Of the 450 lodges in 1825, only 50 remailed in 1834.

As the 1830s progressed, most Antis switched to the new Whig Party, which united all voters opposed to President Jackson. Jackson was a Mason, but so too was his leading opponent Henry Clay. The Anti-Masons brought to the Whigs an intense distrust of politicians and a rejection of automatic party loyalty, together with innovative campaign techniques to whip up excitement among the voters. They invented the national convention in 1835. By 1840, the Antis had ceased to function as a national organization and local cells had disappeared. Those few Antis to become leading politicians, such as William H. Seward, Thurlow Weed and Thaddeus Stevens, became leaders of the Whig Party and Republican parties, and downplayed their early opposition to Freemasonry.

International affairs
In addition to friendly relations with Masonic bodies in other countries, the Masonic movement provided a mechanism for international cooperation among national leaders and men of affairs. According to Joachim Berger,  from the late 19th century Masonic lodges spearheaded efforts to form permanent links between nations. They played an especially active role in 1914-1919, as the leaders that fought against Germany worked hard to promote public opinion favorable to longstanding rivals who were now military allies. Leaders in London and Paris were especially active in building support for the Allies in the United States. By 1918 the goal was gaining support for the new League of Nations, with New York Masons especially active. Political discussions were not allowed during lodge meetings--but the Masonic networks brought together like-minded men who cooperated in promoting internationalism.

See also
 Freemasonry, world-wide
 History of Masonic Grand Lodges in North America

Notes

Further reading
 Berger, Joachim. "The great divide: Transatlantic brothering and masonic internationalism, c. 1870–c. 1930." Atlantic Studies 16.3 (2019): 405-422.
 Bullock, Steven C. Revolutionary brotherhood: Freemasonry and the transformation of the American social order, 1730-1840 (UNC Press Books, 2011). online
 Dickie, John. The Craft: How the Freemasons Made the Modern World (PublicAffairs, 2020). excerpt; chapters 7, 8 15 on USA.
 Dumenil, Lynn. Freemasonry and American Culture: 1880-1930 (Princeton UP, 1984), major scholarly survey. excerpt

 Formisano, Ronald P., and Kathleen Smith Kutolowski. "Antimasonry and Masonry: The Genesis of Protest, 1826-1827." American Quarterly 29.2 (1977): 139-165. online

 Gist, Noel P. Secret Societies: A Cultural Study of Fraternalism in the United States (1941)
 Goodman, Paul. Towards a Christian republic: Antimasonry and the great transition in New England 1826-1836 (Oxford UP, 1988).

 Hackett, David G. That Religion in Which All Men Agree: Freemasonry in American Culture (U of California Press, 2015) excerpt

 Halleran, Michael A. The Better Angels of our Nature: Freemasonry in the American Civil War (U of Alabama Press, 2010) excerpt

 Hernández, Miguel.  The Ku Klux Klan and Freemasonry in 1920s America: Fighting Fraternities (Taylor Francis, 2019)

 Hinks, Peter P. et al. All Men Free and Brethren: Essays on the History of African American Freemasonry  (Cornell UP, 2013).
 Jeffers, H. Paul (2006). The Freemasons in America: Inside the Secret Society. (2006) excerpt, superficial anecdotes

 Kantrowitz, Stephen. " 'Intended for the Better Government of Man': The Political History of African American Freemasonry in the Era of Emancipation." Journal of American History 96#4, (2010), pp. 1001–26. online.

 Lipson, Dorothy Ann. Freemasonry in Federalist Connecticut, 1789-1835 (Princeton UP, 1977). online

 Mackey, Albert Gallatin. The History of Freemasonry, Vol. 6 (Masonic History Co., NY, 1898) pages 1485-1486 online membership by state 1898
 Ridley, Jasper. The Freemasons (1999), wide-ranging global popular history; for US topics see index p 338. online
 Weisberger, R. William et al.  Freemasonry on Both Sides of the Atlantic: Essays concerning the Craft in the British Isles, Europe, the United States, and Mexico (2002), 969pp
 Weisberger, R. William.  Speculative Freemasonry and the Enlightenment: A Study of the Craft in London, Paris, Prague, Vienna and Philadelphia (2d Ed. McFarland, 2017)

 York, Neil L. “Freemasons and the American Revolution.” Historian'' 55#2 (1993), pp. 315–30. online

Anti-Masonry

Freemasonry in the United States